The 1998 UEFA European Under-16 Championship was the 16th edition of UEFA's European Under-16 Football Championship. Scotland hosted the championship, during 26 April – 8 May 1998. 16 teams entered the competition, and Republic of Ireland defeated Italy in the final to win the competition for the first time.

Squads

Qualifying

Participants

Group stage

Group A

Group B

Group C

Group D

Knockout stages

Quarterfinals

Semifinals

Third Place Playoff

Final

References
RSSSF.com
UEFA.com

 
1998
UEFA
UEFA
1998
UEFA European Under-16
UEFA European Under-16
UEFA European Under-16